Herschbach (Oberwesterwald) is an Ortsgemeinde – a community belonging to a Verbandsgemeinde – in the Westerwaldkreis in Rhineland-Palatinate, Germany.  It belongs to the Verbandsgemeinde of Wallmerod, a kind of collective municipality.

Geography

The community lies in the Westerwald between Montabaur and Hachenburg. Herschbach has two outlying centres named Wahnscheid and Lochheim.

History
In 1290, Herschbach had its first documentary mention as Haderichsbach.

Politics

The municipal council is made up of 12 council members who were elected in a majority vote in a municipal election on 7 June 2009.

Economy and infrastructure

Running right through the community is Bundesstraße 8, linking Limburg an der Lahn and Hennef (Sieg). The nearest Autobahn interchange is Montabaur on the A 3 (Cologne–Frankfurt), some 11 km away. The nearest InterCityExpress stop is the railway station at Montabaur on the Cologne-Frankfurt high-speed rail line.

References

External links
 Herschbach (Oberwesterwald) in the collective municipality’s Web pages 

Westerwaldkreis